Luis Alberto "Lucho" García Pacheco (born 20 March 1998) is a Colombian professional footballer who plays as a goalkeeper for Spanish club CF Rayo Majadahonda.

Club career
Born in Barranquilla, García moved to Spain at early age and represented Real Madrid and Rayo Vallecano as a youth. He made his senior debut with the latter's reserves on 6 September 2015, coming on as a second-half substitute for field player Luis Poblete in a 1–3 Tercera División home loss against CA Pinto.

On 11 July 2018, García joined another reserve team, Sevilla Atlético in Segunda División B. He featured sparingly for the side during his spell, being often a backup to Javi Díaz and Alfonso Pastor.

On 8 September 2020, García signed a three-year contract with Deportivo de La Coruña also in the third division. Initially a backup to Carlos Abad, he became the first-choice in February 2021.

On 1 July 2021, García moved to Segunda División side SD Ponferradina. He made his professional debut on 4 September, starting in a 0–2 away loss against CD Tenerife.

On 28 July 2022, after being only a backup option to Amir Abedzadeh, García moved to Primera Federación side CF Rayo Majadahonda.

References

External links

1998 births
Living people
Footballers from Barranquilla
Colombian footballers
Spanish footballers
Association football goalkeepers
Segunda División players
Segunda División B players
Tercera División players
Rayo Vallecano B players
Sevilla Atlético players
Deportivo de La Coruña players
SD Ponferradina players
CF Rayo Majadahonda players
Colombia under-20 international footballers
Colombia youth international footballers
21st-century Colombian people